Velichkov (masculine) or Velichkova is a Bulgarian surname. Notable people with the surname include:

Boycho Velichkov (born 1958), Bulgarian footballer and manager
Boyko Velichkov (born 1974), Bulgarian footballer
Konstantin Velichkov (1855–1907), Bulgarian writer
Lubomir Velichkov (born 1985), Bulgarian footballer
Petar Velichkov (1940–1993), Bulgarian footballer
Stefko Velichkov (born 1949), Bulgarian footballer
Velichko Velichkov (born 1986), Bulgarian footballer

See also
Velichkov Knoll, mountain in Antarctica

Bulgarian-language surnames